Kyōgoku Takakazu may refer to:

 Kyōgoku Takakazu (d. 1441) – Shugo of Yamashiro Province who died defending Ashikaga Yoshinori during the Kakitsu rebellion
 Kyōgoku Takakazu (d. 1662) – Head of the Kyōgoku clan and daimyō under the Tokugawa shogunate
 Kyōgoku Takakazu – Later head of the Kyōgoku clan and daimyō

See also 
 Kyōgoku clan